The Duet technical routine competition of the 2016 European Aquatics Championships was held on 13 May 2016.

Results
The final was held at 08:30.

References

Synchronised swimming